Doba is a commune of 2,760 inhabitants (2011) situated in Satu Mare County, Romania. It is composed of five villages:

Demographics
Ethnic groups (2011 census):
Romanians: 61%
Hungarians: 19%
Roma: 13%
Ukrainians: 4%

61% had Romanian as first language, 23% Hungarian, 9% Romani and 3% Ukrainian.

References

Communes in Satu Mare County